Dino Djulbic (born 16 February 1983) is a former professional footballer who played as a centre-back. Born in the former SFR Yugoslavia, he made two appearances for the Australia national team.

Club career

South Melbourne FC 
Djulbic was signed by South midway through the 2006 season from Frankston Pines as a defensive reinforcement. 

Whilst playing for South Melbourne FC in 2006, Djulbic won a Victorian Premier League Champions medal with a stunning defensive performance against Altona Magic in the Grand Final. Djulbic's performances throughout the season led him to becoming a fan favourite at Lakeside.

Following a successful season at South Melbourne, Djulbic attracted attention from various A-League sides before impressing the Perth Glory coaching staff when on trial with the club in 2006 and was subsequently signed. Djulbic played the first half of the 2007 season with South Melbourne before departing upon his contract with Perth Glory beginning. His last game was against Preston Lions in round 12 at Lakeside Stadium.

Perth Glory 
The 24-year-old was a standout player for the club in his first A-League season and featured prominently in the club's best and fairest award, the Most Glorious Player (MGP Award), coming third behind Nikolai Topor-Stanley and Jamie Coyne. On 31 August 2008, in a match against Sydney FC, Djulbic received a red card for unsporting conduct towards referee Peter Green. He was suspended for five games.

On 20 January 2009, Djulbic signed with German 2. Bundesliga club Rot Weiss Ahlen and returned to his former youth club.

On 30 December 2009, Djulbic left Germany to join Gold Coast United for the last seven games of the club's inaugural season. He appeared in the club's only 2009–10 final, and continued to be a regular starter in the 2010–11 season, contributing three goals whilst helping maintain Gold Coast's solid defence.

Towards the end of the 2010–11 A-League season, Djulbic partook in discussions with Chinese Super League club Shaanxi Renhe Commercial Chanba F.C. He reportedly signed a two-year deal with the club and played his first match on 3 April 2011. The club later changed its name to Guizhou Renhe after moving to Guizhou. Djulbic was rewarded for consistent performance and being a crucial part of Guizhou's AFC Champions League ambitions by making the CSL's XI (All Star Team 2012).

At the conclusion of the 2012 CSL season, Djulbic signed with Al-Wahda S.C.C. on a one and a half-year deal with the Abu Dhabi club.

In the off-season of 2014, Djulbic returned to the A-League, signing again with Perth Glory. After three more seasons with the club he announced he was leaving the Glory in May 2017 to sign with Malaysia Super League club Felda United.

In January 2018, Djulbic returned once more to the A-League, joining Melbourne Victory on a short-term deal as a replacement for the injured James Donachie and for Thomas Deng who was called up to the national under-23 team. After playing three games for Melbourne Victory, Djulbic was released following Deng's return. A week later, Djulibc joined Perth Glory again. Djulbic was released at the end of the 2019–20 A-League.

International career
Dino was born in Bosnia and Herzegovina, but immigrated to Australia via Germany at the age of 16 years and was later naturalized as an Australian. In 2012 during the 2013 EAFF East Asian Cup qualifiers, Djulbic made his Australian national team debut when he featured in two of the Socceroo's Preliminary Round 2 matches against Guam and Chinese Taipei.

Career statistics

Honours
South Melbourne
Victorian Premier League: 2006

Perth Glory
 A-League Premiership: 2018–19

References

External links
 
 Oz Football profile

1983 births
Living people
People from Doboj
Soccer players from Perth, Western Australia
Bosnia and Herzegovina emigrants to Australia
Australian people of Bosnia and Herzegovina descent
Association football central defenders
Bosnia and Herzegovina footballers
Australian soccer players
Australia international soccer players
Perth SC players
Frankston Pines F.C. players
South Melbourne FC players
Perth Glory FC players
Rot Weiss Ahlen players
Gold Coast United FC players
Beijing Renhe F.C. players
Al Wahda FC players
Felda United F.C. players
Melbourne Victory FC players
National Premier Leagues players
A-League Men players
2. Bundesliga players
Chinese Super League players
UAE Pro League players
Malaysia Super League players
Australian expatriate soccer players
Expatriate footballers in Germany
Australian expatriate sportspeople in Germany
Expatriate footballers in China
Australian expatriate sportspeople in China
Expatriate footballers in the United Arab Emirates
Australian expatriate sportspeople in the United Arab Emirates
Expatriate footballers in Malaysia
Australian expatriate sportspeople in Malaysia